Gandhinagar was a constituency of the Rajasthan Legislative Assembly from 1967 to 1977. The seat was abolished in the delimitation exercise and was renamed Banipark constituency. 

In 1972, future Chief Minister Bhairon Singh Shekhawat, contested from Gandhinagar as a Jana Sangh candidate and was defeated.

See also
 List of constituencies of Rajasthan Legislative Assembly

References

Former assembly constituencies of Rajasthan